Aminoacetanilide may refer to:

 2-Aminoacetanilide
 3-Aminoacetanilide
 4-Aminoacetanilide, also known as paracetamin